The  is an educational institute that operates universities and schools in Japan, and previously outside Japan.

Institutions
Current:
 Seijo University (Tokyo)
 Seijo Gakuen Junior High School and High School
 Seijo Gakuen Elementary School
 Seijo Gakuen Kindergarten

Former:
 Lycée Seijo (Kientzheim, France)

References

Further reading
 Annual reports, Seijo Gakuen Education Institute Seijo University   /  - CiNii Books

External links

 Seijo Gakuen Education Institute 

School Corporations in Japan